Rhamphichthys (Rhamphos = Greek for beak and Ichthys = Greek for fish) is a genus of fish that includes the South American sand knifefish. These fish are eel shaped (or anguiform) with a distinct beak like snout which gave them their name. Like most other knifefish Rhamphichthys species have electrical organs that help them live in the murky waters of South America. Currently there are 10 recognized species of Rhamphichthys, although many changes have been made in their taxonomy since their original discovery.

Species
There have been multiple name changes within the genus, included here are currently accepted species, previous groupings that have been collapsed into single species, and genus changes.

 Rhamphichthys apurensis Fernández-Yépez, 1968
Gymnorhamphichthys apurensis Fernández-Yépez, 1968
 Rhamphichthys atlanticus Triques, 1999
 Rhamphichthys drepanium Triques, 1999
 Rhamphichthys hahni Meinken, 1937
Sternarchorhamphus hahni Triques, 1999
 Rhamphichthys heleios T. P. Carvalho & J. S. Albert, 2015
 Rhamphichthys lineatus Castelnau, 1855
 Rhamphichthys longior Triques, 1999
 Rhamphichthys marmoratus Castelnau, 1855
 Rhamphichthys pantherinus Castelnau, 1855
 Rhamphichthys rostratus Linnaeus, 1766
Rhamphichthys blochii Kaup, 1856
Gymnotus longirostrus Lecepède, 1800
Phamphichthys reinhardti Kaup, 1856
Gymnotus rostratus Linnaeus, 1766
Rhamphichthys schneider Kaup, 1856
Rhamphichthys schomburgki Kaup, 1856

Range and Habitat 
All species within Rhamphichthys can be found in the major river systems of South America, notably the Amazon Basin, Orinoco River, Rio de la Plata, and the Paraná River. They have been found in pools created during the rainy season then become isolated as the waters recede. They prefer to stay near the bottom of soft bottom rivers near steep banks with lots of vegetation. These waters are usually extremely murky and full of silt deposits which makes sight difficult, perfect for organisms that can detect their surroundings with weak electric signals.

Characteristics and Biology 
The sand knifefishes are characterized by their elongated bill-like snout and elongated eel-like body. On average they will reach between 26.5 and 100 cm in length. They have a long anal fin that starts just behind their small pectoral fins and end almost at the end of the body. Their caudal or tail fin is either highly reduced or missing (depending on the species). All species lack both dorsal and pelvic fins but do have a dorsal ridge down the center of their back. They also have very small eyes, not relying on sight to find food or detect other organisms. Coloration varies between species, but all seem to have highly mottles coloration with a lighter base color on the belly (or venter) and darker colors on the back (or dorsum). The spots seem to be larger on the back and get smaller as they move down to the underside. Some individuals seem to have a blue tint to their anal fin, but it is not yet understood if that is characteristic of a species or not. Internally they have highly reduced gill rakers, a large stomach, and an anteriorly positioned anus which lies directly under the pectoral fins.

Not much is known about their behavior and biology. They are opportunistic predators feeding predominately on invertebrates such as insects and crustaceans dug up from the sandy river bottoms, but seem to eat small fish as well. They seem to keep to a relatively small home range and are solitary except while breeding. They use their electrical organs to identify prey, competitors, mates, and possible predators. It is thought they mate during the dry season when waters are warm and low.

Evolution 
Within the order Gymnotiformes there are five families: Rhamphichthys along with the genera Steatogenys, Hypopygus, Gymnorhamphichthys and Iracema, lie within the family Rhamphichthyidae which is sister to Hypopmidae. These two families are the second youngest within the Order. The youngest being Apteronotidae.  It is interesting to note that there are fewer described species in this order with respect to the number of Families described. This is likely due to how little we know about the group as a whole, they are hard to find and study, so it is likely that there are far more species than we currently know about. It is also possible that because of their specialized nature they have not been driven to differentiate further to alter competition loads. Please note the phylogeny in this image is incorrect: all recent phyoogenetic and phylogenomic studies report the following interfamily relationships: Gymnotidae ((Hypopomidae, Rhamphichthyidae) (Sternopygidae, Apteronotidae)). See Tagliacollo, V. A., Bernt, M. J., Craig, J. M., Oliveira, C., & Albert, J. S. (2016). Model-based total evidence phylogeny of Neotropical electric knifefishes (Teleostei, Gymnotiformes). Molecular phylogenetics and evolution, 95, 20-33.

Weakly Electric Ability 
Rhamphichthys, like other Gymnotiformes fishes, contain an electric organ that takes up the back third if the body. This electric organ pulses at a constant frequency and allows the fish to 'visualize' its surroundings by forming an electric field around the body. Any disturbance to that electric field indicates an object that it close y. Electroreceptors an the body allows the fish to indicate the type of disturbance which allows them to indicate that type of object is nearby.

There are different types of electrical pulses that the fish can give off and each has a different function. This is necessary because their electric fields can be disturbed by other fish using their own electrical field, causing 'noise'. This makes it difficult for individuals to orient themselves. By using different types of pulses noise is reduced. Different species emit at different frequency ranges and individuals within a species emit at their own unique frequency. These differences in frequency allow individuals to identify other individuals, not just distinguish between species. 

Different types of pulses

 Orientation - constant low-level output for orientation in the water to avoid obstacles
 Prey location - Short pulses that work similar to sonar where disturbance responses identify location of prey items
 JAR (jamming avoidance response) - Defense strategy where a strong pulse is emitted to interrupt sensory systems of potential predators or threats.
 Gradual Frequency falls - short identifying pulses used to communicate with same species individuals or 'neighbors' for territory identification or finding mates.

References

Rhamphichthyidae
Fish of South America
Freshwater fish genera
Taxa named by Johannes Peter Müller
Taxa named by Franz Hermann Troschel